The 1983–84 Ranji Trophy was the 50th season of the Ranji Trophy. Mumbai won the final against Delhi on first innings lead, thanks mainly to a double century by Sunil Gavaskar.

Highlights
 Dilip Vengsarkar of Bombay scored hundreds in the quarter final, semifinal and the final.
 Kiran More of Baroda scored a career-best 181* in the quarter final against Uttar Pradesh and added a Ranji trophy record 145 for the last wicket with Vasudev Patel.
 Rajinder Goel took 5/7 and 5/18 for Haryana v Jammu and Kashmir.

Group stage

Central Zone

South Zone

West Zone

North Zone

East Zone

Knockout stage

Final

Scorecards and averages
Cricketarchive

References

External links

1984 in Indian cricket
Domestic cricket competitions in 1983–84
Ranji Trophy seasons